The fifth series of The Voice เสียงจริงตัวจริง ( also known as The Voice Thailand ) on 11 September 2016. The show was hosted by Songsit Rungnopphakhunsi and Rinrani Siphen on Channel 3. The show was temporarily postponed due to King Bhumibol's death, delaying the 6th episode until 20 November 2016.

Teams
Colour key

The Blind Auditions

Episode 1: Blind Auditions,  Week 1 
The first blind audition episode was broadcast on 11 September 2016.

Episode 2: Blind Auditions,  Week 2 
The second blind audition episode was broadcast on 18 September 2016.

Episode 3: Blind Auditions,  Week 3 
The third blind audition episode was broadcast on 25 September 2016.

Episode 4: Blind Auditions,  Week 4 
The fourth blind audition episode was broadcast on 2 October 2016.

Episode 5: Blind Auditions,  Week 5 
The fifth blind audition episode was broadcast on 9 October 2016.

Episode 6: Blind Auditions,  Week 6 
The sixth blind audition episode was broadcast on 20 November 2016.

The Battles 
The Battles started with episode 7 and ended with episode 10 (broadcast on 27 November, 4, 11, 18 December 2016). The coaches can steal two losing artists from another coach. Contestants who win their battle or are stolen by another coach will advance to the Knockouts.

Color key:

The Knockouts 
Color key:

Live Shows

Episode 13: Live Playoffs Week 1 (22 January) 
  Advanced
  Eliminated

  Winner
  Runner-up
  Third Place
  Fourth Place

Episode 14: Live Playoffs Week 2 (29 January) 
  Advanced
  Eliminated

  Winner
  Runner-up
  Third Place
  Fourth Place

Episode 15: Finals (5 February) 
  Winner
  Runner-up
  Third Place

References

External links
The official website

The Voice Thailand
2016 Thai television seasons
2017 Thai television seasons